Cajori is a lunar impact crater that is located in the southern hemisphere on the far side of the Moon. It lies to the southwest of the walled plain Von Kármán, and to the east-southeast of the crater Chrétien.

The outer rim of Cajori has been heavily damaged by impacts, leaving a disintegrating outer perimeter that is irregular and notched along its edges. Several small craters lie along the edge, with the most notable being Cajori K attached to the southeast rim. The inner floor is less heavily impacted, and is marked only by some tiny craterlets.

Satellite craters 

By convention these features are identified on lunar maps by placing the letter on the side of the crater midpoint that is closest to Cajori.

References 

 
 
 
 
 
 
 
 
 
 
 
 

Impact craters on the Moon